Fetishes is a 1996 documentary by Nick Broomfield filmed at Pandora's Box, one of New York City's most luxurious SM/fetish parlours. The film contains interviews with professional dominatrices and their clients including the New York filmmaker Maria Beatty.

The documentary opens with black and white footage from an Irving Klaw film depicting models, including Bettie Page, wearing fetish attire. Nick Broomfield and his film crew then arrive at Pandora's Box on Manhattan's Fifth Avenue and are given a tour of the facility by Mistress Raven, including the dungeon and the medical room. The rest of the documentary consists of the following eight chapters:
Slaves
Mistresses
Rubber fetish
Wrestling fetish
Corporal punishment
Masochism
Infantilism
Socio-political fetishes

The film was produced in the United Kingdom and was originally made for HBO. It was released in the United States on DVD, (runtime 84 minutes, in colour), and more recently as part of Nick Broomfield's 'Documenting Icons' box set. A full, uncut version with additional archive material is also available in the UK.

See also 
 BDSM
 Fetishism
 Rubberist
 Maria Beatty

External links
 Information about the documentary, including a trailer
 A Chat with Mistress Raven of Pandora's Box (NY Rock)
 Review of Fetishes, Nick Broomfield's documentary on Pandora's Box (NY Rock)
 

1996 films
British documentary films
BDSM in films
Films directed by Nick Broomfield
1996 documentary films
Documentary films about sexuality
Documentary films about New York City
1990s English-language films
1990s British films
English-language documentary films